Adnan Taess Akkar Al-Mntfage (born 24 March 1980 in Wasit) is an Iraqi middle-distance runner. At the 2012 Summer Olympics, he competed in the Men's 800 metres.

Competition record

References

External links 

1980 births
Living people
Iraqi male middle-distance runners
Olympic athletes of Iraq
Athletes (track and field) at the 2012 Summer Olympics
Asian Games medalists in athletics (track and field)
Athletes (track and field) at the 2010 Asian Games
Athletes (track and field) at the 2014 Asian Games
Athletes (track and field) at the 2018 Asian Games
People from Wasit Governorate
World Athletics Championships athletes for Iraq
Asian Games gold medalists for Iraq
Asian Games silver medalists for Iraq
Asian Games bronze medalists for Iraq
Medalists at the 2010 Asian Games
Medalists at the 2014 Asian Games